Fagernes Station was a railway station located in Fagernes, Nord-Aurdal, Norway. It was on the Valdres Line (Valdresbanen) which was in operation from 1902 until 1989.

History
The station was opened on 1 October 1906 by King Haakon VII and remained until the line closed on 1 January 1989. Originally the restaurant at the station was run by Fagernes Hotel, which is located adjacent to the station. Following the new station building which was built in the early 1950s, Norsk Spisevognselskap took over the operation of the restaurant in the new building.

References

Railway stations in Oppland
Railway stations on the Valdres Line
Railway stations opened in 1906
Railway stations closed in 1989
1906 establishments in Norway
Nord-Aurdal